South Orangetown Central School District (SOCSD) is a school district headquartered in Blauvelt, New York.

Its schools are William O. Schaefer Elementary School (Tappan), Cottage Lane Elementary School (Blauvelt), South Orangetown Middle School (Blauvelt), and Tappan Zee High School (Orangeburg).

History
Tappan Zee Elementary School used to be a part of the district but closed in 2016 due to declining enrollment. Its students moved into William O. Schaefer Elementary School and Cottage Lane Elementary School.

Kenneth Mitchell served as superintendent until his 2014 retirement. Then Dr. Robert Pritchard became superintendent and is still today.

References

External links
 South Orangetown Central School District
School districts in New York (state)
Education in Rockland County, New York